Cate Le Bon (born Cate Timothy on 4 March 1983) is a Welsh musician and record producer. She sings in both English and Welsh. She has released six solo studio albums, three EPs and a number of singles. Le Bon has toured with artists such as St. Vincent, Perfume Genius and John Grant.

Career
Le Bon was born on 4 March 1983 in Penboyr, Carmarthenshire, Wales, and first gained public attention when she supported Gruff Rhys (of the Super Furry Animals) on his 2007 solo UK tour. She appeared as a guest vocalist on Neon Neon's 2008 single "I Lust U" from their album Stainless Style. Under her original name she provided backing vocals on Richard James's debut solo album The Seven Sleepers Den in 2006. She also appeared on his second solo album, We Went Riding, from 2010.

Her first official release was a Welsh language EP, Edrych yn Llygaid Ceffyl Benthyg ("Looking in the Eyes of a Borrowed Horse", similar to the English expression "to look a gift horse in the mouth"), on Peski Records in 2008. She also self-released the double A-side debut single "No One Can Drag Me Down" / "Disappear" (described by Gruff Rhys as "Bobbie Gentry and Nico fight over a Casio keyboard; melody wins!") on her website. Le Bon worked alongside Gorky's Zygotic Mynci's Megan Childs, who contributed violin, and Super Furry Animals and Thrills collaborator John Thomas, who added pedal steel.

Her debut album, Me Oh My was released in 2009, followed by Cyrk and the Cyrk II EP in 2012.

In January 2013, Le Bon moved to Los Angeles to further her career in the US. Her third album, Mug Museum, was released November 2013. It was produced by Noah Georgeson and Josiah Steinbrick in Los Angeles, and featured Stephen Black (bass) and Huw Evans (guitar). During that year, she provided guest vocals on two albums: the track "Slow Train" from Kevin Morby's debut album Harlem River and "4 Lonely Roads" from Manic Street Preachers's album Rewind the Film.

In 2015, Le Bon collaborated with Tim Presley as DRINKS and released the album Hermits on Holiday in August 2015. DRINKS released their second album Hippo Lite in April 2018.

Le Bon released her fourth studio album, Crab Day, on 15 April 2016 on Drag City to generally favourable reviews. The album was produced by Josiah Steinbrick and Noah Georgeson, and again featured Stephen Black (bass) and Huw Evans (guitar), with Stella Mozgawa (drums). She noted how the collaboration with Presley had made her realise "that I make music because I love to, not because I have to". On tour she was supported by Black and Evans and on occasion by Steinbrick and Josh Klinghoffer, a five-piece that also performs instrumental improvisations under the name BANANA.

In January 2017, Le Bon released the four-track EP Rock Pool via Drag City. It includes her version of the track "I Just Want to Be Good" which she wrote for Sweet Baboo's 2015 album The Boombox Ballads. In the same month Leaving Records released Live by BANANA, recorded live during the band's 2016 tour  and Le Bon remixed Eleanor Friedberger's song "Are We Good?" from the album Rebound (2018).

In 2018, Le Bon signed with Brooklyn based record label Mexican Summer (Ariel Pink, Jessica Pratt, Connan Mockasin). That same year, she joined John Cale of the Velvet Underground onstage at the Barbican Centre with the London Contemporary Orchestra.

Le Bon released her fifth studio album, Reward via Mexican Summer on 24 May 2019. It was followed by her sixth full-length studio album, Pompeii, on 4 February 2022, again via Mexican Summer. Le Bon began working on Pompeii during the first wave of the COVID-19 pandemic in Wales.

Le Bon's producer credits include: John Grant - Boy from Michigan, H. Hawkline - In the Pink of Condition, Tim Presley - The WiNK, H. Hawkline - I Romantasize, Alex Dingley - Beat the Babble, Josiah Steinbrick - Meeting of Waters, Deerhunter - Why Hasn't Everything Already Disappeared?

Musical style
Critic Laura Snapes described Le Bon as "a ringleader who's prepared to stake out uncertain territory. Le Bon always keeps you guessing, making the old traditions of guitar-oriented rock feel arbitrary, too. Her nervy assessments of the world are filled with equal parts suspense and heart, and beautifully zany riffs, where the feeling of being frayed by uncertainty comes together into a strangely comforting patchwork." In an interview with Pitchfork, Jeff Tweedy of Wilco stated that Le Bon was "one of the best out there making music now." Describing her sound, he said "it's really rare for people to have a specific sound anymore, but I can always tell when it's her playing guitar. Whenever I try to figure out her guitar parts, they’re way harder than they sound."

Discography
Studio albums
 Me Oh My (Irony Bored, 2009)
 Cyrk (The Control Group, 2012)
 Mug Museum (Turnstile / Wichita, 2013)
 Crab Day (Turnstile / Drag City, 2016)
 Reward (Mexican Summer, 2019)
 Pompeii (Mexican Summer, 2022)

With DRINKS
 Hermits on Holiday (Heavenly Recordings, 2015)
 Hippo Lite (Drag City, 2018)

EPs
 Edrych yn Llygaid Ceffyl Benthyg (Peski Records, 2008)
 Cyrk II (Turnstile, 2012)
 Rock Pool (Drag City, 2017)
 Myths 004 (with Bradford Cox) (Mexican Summer, 2019)
 Here It Comes Again (with Group Listening) (Mexican Summer, 2019)

Singles
 "No One Can Drag Me Down / Disappear" (self-released, 2007)
 "I Can't Help You" (Turnstile, 2014)
 "He's Leaving / Solitude" (Turnstile, 2014)

References

External links
 Official homepage
 
 
 

1983 births
Living people
21st-century Welsh women singers
Welsh-speaking musicians
Wichita Recordings artists
Baroque pop musicians
Mexican Summer artists
Drag City (record label) artists